The California Raisin Advisory Board (or CALRAB) was a California state marketing commission based in Fresno, California that was created in the mid-1900s to coordinate the regulation and promotion of the state's raisin crop. The group became most noted from 1986 to 1994 for developing an international advertising campaign using The California Raisins claymation characters. The California Raisin campaign was funded by an initial grant of US$3 million from the United States Department of Agriculture. Although popular with the public, the California Raisin campaign eventually failed because its production cost the raisin growers almost twice their earnings. CALRAB was closed on July 31, 1994, due to disagreements with raisin producers over the fairness of required payments to the organization. In 1998, the California Raisin Marketing Board, funded by raisin growers, was established to replace CALRAB as the promotional organization for the raisin crop.

References

External links 
 California Raisin Marketing Board website 

Raisins
Agriculture in California
Agricultural marketing organizations
Agricultural organizations based in the United States
Defunct organizations based in California
Organizations based in Fresno, California
1900s establishments in California
1998 disestablishments in California
Government agencies established in the 1900s
Organizations disestablished in 1998
Agricultural marketing in the United States